Bishop's ward is an administrative division of the London Borough of Lambeth, United Kingdom. It is located in the north of the borough, bounded by the river Thames, and contains many well known London sites including the Southbank Centre, the London Eye, the Old and New Vic theatres, County Hall and Lambeth Palace. It also contains Waterloo station and St Thomas Hospital.

Bishop's ward is located in the Vauxhall parliamentary constituency and is one of four wards in the borough's north Lambeth division.

The Lambeth Council State of the Borough 2014 report found that Bishop's was the least residential ward of the borough. It has the lowest ward population (10,600), with a low proportion of children – over 80% of residents are working age, with many born outside UK. It has the highest number of jobs and the highest employment per head of resident working age population. Health outcomes, such as life expectancy and childhood obesity are typical of the borough. It has the highest proportion of Asian residents in the borough.

Although the riverside areas are affluent, household income in most of the rest of the ward is comparable with the borough as a whole. Housing tenure is similar to the borough as a whole – 21% home owners, 42% Social rented, 34% private rented. It has the highest proportion of flats, and house prices are high - 30% of dwellings are in the higher council tax (property tax) bands F, G or H.
Bishop͛s had the highest ward crime  rate figures , especially violence against the person and theft and handling – this is associated with large numbers of people in the ward at Waterloo station and the South Bank.

Lambeth Council elections

References

External links
Bishop's ward results on Lambeth website
Website of the three Councillors for Bishop's Ward

Wards of the London Borough of Lambeth